Nicolas Maranda (born 15 November 1967 in Auckland, New Zealand) is a Canadian singer-songwriter, composer, musician and record producer based in Montreal. His compositional style is eclectic, blending acoustic, electric and electronic elements into distinct soundscapes. His compositions have appeared on record, in television series and feature films. His productions have covered many styles of music, from house music to tango and from rock to Arabic. His performances on record include various guitars, basses, keyboards, and percussion instruments, as well as more exotic instruments such as oud and didgeridoo. He has played hundreds of shows in Canada, the United States, Europe, The Middle East, Australia, Haïti, and exotic locations such as the North Pole and the jungles of East Timor.

Early years
Nicolas Maranda is the second son of anthropologists Pierre Maranda and Elli Köngäs-Maranda. His first year was spent within the Rere tribe of Lau Lagoon in the Solomon Islands, of which he is still considered a member. His family then spent a year in Paris and settled in Vancouver, BC, where he started playing the piano at age four. The family eventually moved to Quebec City, where he took up the guitar. Mostly self-taught, he eventually added other instruments to his repertoire.

These years were marked by numerous trips across the globe that would prove to be influential in his vision.

1980s–1990s
In Quebec City he founded the band BoYcuT which gained a local following. When Nicolas was 16, the band moved to Montreal. Nicolas concurrently took up studies in record production and sound engineering. The band made some noise, placing among the finalists at the "Empire des Futures Stars" band competition and gaining some radio airplay. They went on to tour in Canada and Europe.
 
Nicolas eventually started writing more and more on his own and left the band, which disbanded. After a stint in London, he returned to Quebec City to work with ex-DJ Daniel Coulombe in the studio. Together they produced various projects, including a remix of the song "Des Fleurs pour Salinger" by French band Indochine, which became an international hit. The pair then co-produced Nicolas’ first album (in French), Deux, released in 1991, which saw him move back to Montreal. It was the first release of independent label les Disques Tacca. The record included several songs that charted in Quebec and France, including "Fleur du mal", "Blanche comme la nuit" and "Douce". It was on several critics’ lists of best album of the year, including Claude Rajotte. Maranda and the album were nominated for awards at the 1992 ADISQ Gala. The video for "Fleur du mal" won "Best Independent Video" at the 1992 MusiquePlus Video Gala. His other videos also made a considerable impact and were similarly nominated for awards. He performed on stage and television in Canada and France. However conflicts within the label put things at a standstill as to how to go ahead with the second album.
 
In parallel Maranda co-wrote with his then-partner, singer-songwriter Pascale Coulombe. They recorded an album that was originally planned to come out under her name, but since it was a collaboration they released it under the name "Coma" (a play of words on their last names).
 
The album was influential and the videos also stood out, with "Carmen" winning Best French Video at the 1997 MuchMusic Video Awards. Their other videos also garnered nominations. Maranda and Coulombe eventually worked on concepts of videos by other artists including Daniel Bélanger.
 
In 1998 the pair spent some time in Los Angeles, where they co-wrote the song "Lost Between Las Vegas and Mars" with Guy Thomas. The song was featured in the award-winning documentary Beyond The Mat. They returned to Canada to play a series of concerts for Canadian troops that led them to the North Pole.
 
Other similar tours followed in Egypt, Israel, Australia and East Timor. At the turn of the millennium they convened to each head on to separate projects.

2000s
Nicolas subsequently produced a string of albums, by Richard Petit, Lynda Thalie, Andrée Watters and Intakto. He also contributed songwriting and arranging to most of them. Andrée Watters (twice) and Intakto won "Best Record" in their respective categories at the ADISQ Gala. He also wrote music for video games, notably songs for The Jungle Book Groove Party by Ubisoft/ Disney, which led him back to work in Los Angeles. In the early 2000s he also worked on a series of remixes with House group the Couch Potatoes for Petit, Thalie, Coulombe, Dubmatique and Mitsou. As a member of the live band he played at different Cirque du Soleil premières in Canada and abroad. During this period he studied acting with Warren Robertson.
 
From 2002 to 2007 he started writing extensively for TV series. He was awarded a Gémeaux in 2007 for his work on the seminal series Minuit, le soir. He also scored Au nom de la loi and Le Petit monde de Laura Cadieux. He received Gémeaux nominations for each of his scores. He also conceived and directed the video for the song "La Valse des hypocrites" by Mathieu Gaudet (which he had produced).
 
In late 2007 he released the music from Minuit, Le Soir online and on a limited-edition double CD. CD 2 is remix album, including remixes by Carl Bastien, Beno, Thomas Carbou, Daniel Coulombe, Robert De La Gauthier, Jonathan Eekkoo Doyon, Flow, Samuel Laflamme and Samuel Girardin, Monsieur Seb, Pasquipaz and Raycord.

2010s
In addition to collaborating with House Music collective Monitor, who released an album on Mile-End records, Maranda scored acclaimed TV drama 19–2. He received two additional Gémeaux awards for his work. The soundtrack album was released on Audiogram records.

Maranda is currently writing and recording an English-language album. Work began in Montreal and was continued in Honduras and South Africa before resuming in Montreal. In South Africa he recorded a seventeen-voice Xhosa choir, the St-Raphael Catholic Church Choir, for his song "We Are Free". In Montreal he recorded tracks with childhood idol Tony Levin and Youssou N’dour’s tama (talking Drum) player Assane Thiam.

Nicolas has been guest speaker in various schools and organizations. He is a multiple grant holder from le Conseil des arts et letters du Québec. He has also served as jury president for the Gémeaux awards and juror for Musicaction.

Selected discography
(All titles refer to albums unless otherwise noted)

2011
Nicolas Maranda, 19–2
Composer, arranger, musician
(Double Gémeau Award-winning soundtrack)

2011
Monitor, Monitor
Composer, songwriter, singer, arranger, producer, musician, mixer

2008
Nicolas Maranda, Minuit le soir – l'album double
Composer, arranger, singer, musician
(Gémeau Award-winning soundtrack)

2006
Intakto "Todavia”
Co-producer, arranger, musician and mixer
(ADSIQ nominee, "Best World Music Album")
 
2006
Lynda Thalie, Lynda Thalie
Producer, arranger, songwriter and musician
(ADSIQ nominee, "Best World Music Album")
 
2005
Arthur H, Adieu Tristesse
Musician
 
2005
Andrée Watters, À Travers
Producer, arranger, songwriter and musician
(ADSIQ winner, "Best Rock Album")
 
2004
Mathieu Gaudet, "Roadtrip”
Producer, arranger and musician
 
2003
Andrée Watters, AW
Co-producer, arranger, songwriter musician and mixer
(ADSIQ winner, "Best Rock Album")
 
2002
Intakto, Intakto
Producer, arranger, musician and mixer
(ADSIQ winner, "Best World Music Album")
(JUNO nominee, "Best World Music Album")
 
2002
Lynda Thalie, Sablier
Producer, arranger, songwriter, musician and mixer
 
2001
Dubmatique, Ragga Dub (Remix)
Co-producer, arranger, musician and mixer
 
2000
Richard Petit, Kiss and Run
Producer, arranger, songwriter, musician and mixer
 
1997
Coma, "Remix”
Songwriter, singer, arranger, producer, musician, mixer
 
1996
Coma, Coma
Arranger, songwriter and musician
 
1991
Nicolas, Deux
Composer, songwriter, singer, arranger, co-producer, musician and co-mixer
(ADSIQ nominee, "Best Rock Album", "Revelation Of The Year")
 
1990
Indochine, Des Fleurs pour Salinger (Remix)
Co-producer, arranger and musician

References

External links

Minuit, le soir soundtrack

Canadian singer-songwriters
New Zealand emigrants to Canada
1967 births
Living people
Canadian people of Finnish descent